Protactinium(IV) chloride is an inorganic compound. It is an actinide halide, composed of protactinium and chlorine. It is radioactive, and has the chemical formula of PaCl4. It is a chartreuse-coloured (yellowish-green) crystal of the tetragonal crystal system.

Preparation 

Protactinium(IV) chloride can be prepared by the reduction of protactinium(V) chloride:

2 PaCl5 + H2 -> 2 PaCl4 + 2 HCl
3 PaCl5 + Al -> 3 PaCl4 + AlCl3

It can also be obtained by the chlorination of protactinium(IV) oxide:

PaO2 + 2 CCl4 -> PaCl4 + 2 COCl2

It can also be formed during the thermal decomposition of protactinium oxychloride at 500 °C in a vacuum:

2 PaOCl2 -> PaCl4 + PaO2

Properties 

Protactinium(IV) chloride is a chartreuse, hygroscopic, crystalline solid that can be sublimed at 400 °C in a vacuum. It is soluble in strong mineral acids, forming green solutions. The complex PaCl4·4CH3CN is formed with acetonitrile. It has a tetragonal crystal structure with the space group I41/amd (space group no. 141) and the lattice parameters a = 837.7 pm, c = 747.9 pm of the uranium(IV) chloride type.

References 

Chlorides
Actinide halides
Protactinium compounds